Chak No. 3 is a place in Mandi Bahauddin District of the Punjab province of Pakistan.

References

http://www.mbdin.net/455/  at wayback machine archive

Villages in Mandi Bahauddin District